Owens Valley  (Numic: Payahǖǖnadǖ, meaning "place of flowing water") is an arid valley of the Owens River in eastern California in the United States. It is located to the east of the Sierra Nevada, west of the White Mountains and Inyo Mountains, and north of the Mojave Desert. It sits on the west edge of the Great Basin. The Sierra Nevada casts the valley in a rain shadow, which makes Owens Valley "the Land of Little Rain." The bed of Owens Lake, now a predominantly dry endorheic alkali flat, sits on the southern end of the valley.

The valley provides water to the Los Angeles Aqueduct, the source of one-third of the water for Los Angeles, and was the area at the center of one of the fiercest and longest-running episodes of the California Water Wars. These episodes inspired aspects of the 1974 film Chinatown. The current arid nature of the valley is mostly due to LADWP diverting the water of the region. Owens Lake was completely emptied by 1926, only 13 years after Los Angeles began diverting water.

Towns in the Owens Valley include Bishop, Lone Pine, Independence and Big Pine; about 25,000 people live in the valley. The major road in the Owens Valley is U.S. Route 395.

Geology 
About three million years ago, the Sierra Nevada Fault and the White Mountains Fault systems became active with repeated episodes of slip earthquakes gradually producing the impressive relief of the eastern Sierra Nevada and White Mountain escarpments that bound the northern Owens Valley-Mono Basin region.

Owens Valley is a graben—a down-dropped block of land between two vertical faults—the westernmost in the Basin and Range Province. It is also part of a trough which extends from Oregon to Death Valley called the Walker Lane.<ref name=alt>{{cite book|title=Roadside Geology of Northern and Central California|last=Alt|author2=Hyndman|publisher=Mountain Press Publishing Company| location= Missoula| year=2000|isbn=0-87842-409-1}}</ref>

The western flank of much of the valley has large moraines coming off the Sierra Nevada. These unsorted piles of rock, boulders, and dust were pushed to where they are by glaciers during the last ice age. An excellent example of a moraine is on State Route 168 as it climbs into Buttermilk Country.

This graben was formed by a long series of earthquakes, such as the 1872 Lone Pine earthquake, that have moved the graben down and helped move the Sierra Nevada up. The graben is much larger than the depth of the valley suggests; gravity studies suggest that  of sedimentary rock mostly fills the graben and that a very steep escarpment is buried under the western length of the valley. The topmost part of this escarpment is exposed at Alabama Hills.

The Owens Valley has many mini-volcanoes, such as Crater Mountain in the Big Pine volcanic field.  Smaller versions of the Devils Postpile, can be found, for example, by Little Lake.

Ecology
The valley contains plants adapted to alkali flat habitat. One of these, the Owens Valley checkerbloom (Sidalcea covillei), is endemic to Owens Valley.

 History 
The valley was inhabited in late prehistoric times by the Timbisha (also called Panamint or Koso) in the extreme south end around Owens Lake and by the Mono tribe (also called Owens Valley Paiute) in the central and northern portions of the valley. The Timbisha speak the Timbisha language, classified in the Numic branch of Uto-Aztecan language family. The closest related languages are Shoshoni and Comanche. The Eastern Mono speak a dialect of the Mono language, which is also Numic but is more closely related to Northern Paiute. The Timbisha presently live in Death Valley at Furnace Creek although most families also have summer homes in the Lone Pine colony. The Eastern Mono live in several colonies from Lone Pine to Bishop. Trade between Native Americans of the Owens Valley and coastal tribes such as the Chumash has been indicated by the archaeological record.

On May 1, 1834, Joseph R. Walker entered Owens Valley at the mouth of Walker Pass. Walker and his group of 52 men traveled up the valley on their way back to the Humboldt Sink, and back up the Humboldt River to the Rocky Mountains.

In 1845, John C. Fremont named the Owens valley, river, and lake for Richard Owens, one of his guides. Camp Independence was established on Oak Creek nearby modern Independence, California, on July 4, 1862, during the Owens Valley Indian War.

From 1942 to 1945, during World War II, the first Japanese American Internment camp operated in the valley at Manzanar near Independence, California.

 Water diversion to Los Angeles 

In the early 20th century, the valley became the scene of a struggle between local residents and the city of Los Angeles over water rights. William Mulholland, superintendent of the Los Angeles Department of Water and Power (LADWP), planned the   Los Angeles Aqueduct, completed in 1913, which diverted water from the Owens River. The water rights were acquired deceitfully, often splitting water cooperatives and pitting neighbors against one another. In 1924, local farmers were fed up with the purchases and erupted in violence, sabotaging parts of the water system.

Gary Libecap of the University of California, Santa Barbara, observed that the price Los Angeles was willing to pay to other water sources per volume of water was far higher than what the farmers received. Farmers who resisted the pressure from Los Angeles until 1930 received the highest price for their land; most farmers sold their land from 1905 to 1925, and received less than Los Angeles was willing to pay. However, the sale of their land brought the farmers substantially more income than if they had kept the land for farming and ranching. None of the sales were made under threat of eminent domain. As a result of these acquisitions, the lake subsequently dried up completely, leaving the present alkali flat which plagues the southern valley with alkali dust storms.

In 1970, LADWP completed a second aqueduct from Owens Valley. More surface water was diverted, and groundwater was pumped to feed the aqueduct. Owens Valley springs and seeps dried and disappeared, and groundwater-dependent vegetation began to die.

Years of litigation followed. In 1997, Inyo County, Los Angeles, the Owens Valley Committee, the Sierra Club, and other concerned parties signed a Memorandum of Understanding that specified terms by which the lower Owens River would be rewatered by June 2003. LADWP missed this deadline and was sued again. Under another settlement, this time including the State of California, Los Angeles promised to rewater the lower Owens River by September 2005. In July 2004, Los Angeles mayor James Hahn proposed barring all future development on its Owens Valley holdings by proposing a conservation easement for all LADWP land. They did not meet this extended deadline. In 2008, Los Angeles fulfilled its promise and rewatered the lower Owens River. 

Pursuant to a 2014 agreement between the city and Great Basin Unified Air Pollution Control District (GBUAPCD, the Owens Valley air quality regulators), LADWP began using a new method of suppressing airborne dust from the dry bed of Owens Lake. In 2022, the GBUAPCD issued an order and subsequently fined the Los Angeles utility for ignoring an order to control dust on a 5-acre patch of dry lake bed. The LADWP responded with a lawsuit, accusing the air district of exceeding its authority and ordering dust control measures without first conducting an environmental analysis of its impacts, as required by the California Environmental Quality Act. A California Superior Court ruled that the 2014 agreement doesn't cover the dispute and the fines levied by GBUAPCD are unenforceable.

Radio observatory
The Owens Valley Radio Observatory located near Westgard Pass is one of ten dishes making up the Very Long Baseline Array (VLBA).

See also
Owens River
Bibliography of the Sierra Nevada — for further reading.

 Notes 

 References Cadillac Desert, Marc Reisner, revised edition, Penguin USA, (1993), Geology Underfoot in Death Valley and Owens Valley, Sharp, Glazner (Mountain Press Publishing Company, Missoula; 1997) 
Spirit in the Desert: Pilgrimages to Sacred Sites in the Owens Valley, Brad Karelius, BookSurge Publishing, (2009). , 0-520-07245-6Western Times and Water Wars, John Walton, University of California Press, (1992). The Water Seekers'', Remi Nadeau, Crest Publishers, (4th edition: 1997),

Further reading

External links

The Owens Valley Committee: The Owens Valley
Cenozoic/Mesozoic Volcanism of the Eastern Sierra Nevada
Groundwater Quality in the Owens Valley, California United States Geological Survey
Lower Owens River Project -  restoration of the lower owens river
Inyo County Water Department
Eval. of the Hydrologic System and Selected Water-Management Alternatives in the Owens Valley, California
Roadside Geology and Mining History of the Owens Valley and Mono Basin
 Deepest Valley: Owens Valley resource 
 Prehistory of Owens Valley